Malcolm Golby Haines (12 October 1936 – 13 January 2013) was a British plasma physicist known for his research on Z-pinches. He was a Fellow of the American Physical Society and was co-awarded the 2005 Hannes Alfvén Prize.

Early life and career 
Haines studied at Imperial College London in 1953 and has remained there for the rest of his life. He obtained a Bachelor of Science (B.S.) and Doctor of Philosophy (Ph.D.) in 1957 and 1960 respectively. He then joined the Imperial College faculty as a lecturer in 1960, was promoted to senior lecturer in 1967 and later appointed Professor of Physics. He then retired in 2002, but was still active in research in the Plasma Physics Group as emeritus professor.

Scientific contributions 
After Russian scientists led by Valentin Smirnov had achieved a breakthrough in plasma physics by using rod grids in Z-pinch arrangements, Haines optimized the grids and other experimental parameters and undertook theoretical simulations of the implosion processes. They were tested on MAGPIE (Mega Ampere Generator for Plasma Implosion Experiments) at Imperial College. The method revolutionized the research of inertial fusion with Z-pinch arrangements (and their use as the strongest known X-ray sources) up to the construction of the Z-machine at Sandia National Laboratories under Tom Sanford. In 2006, he and his colleagues proposed a model to explain the record temperatures of 2 to 3 billion Kelvin generated in the Z machine - the eddies formed by the numerous instabilities of the intense magnetic field are slowed down in the dense plasma and give their energy to the ions.

Honors and awards 
In 1995, Haines was inducted as a Fellow of the American Physical Society. In 2005, he received the Hannes Alfvén Prize with Tom Sanford and Valentin Smirnov.

References 

1936 births
2013 deaths
English plasma physicists
Alumni of Imperial College London
Fellows of the American Physical Society